The Brewers Association (BA) is an American trade group of over 5,400 brewers, breweries in planning, suppliers, distributors, craft beer retailers, and individuals particularly concerned with the promotion of craft beer and homebrewing.

Two of the largest programs supported by the BA are the American Homebrewers Association (AHA) and the annual Great American Beer Festival (GABF).

The current president and CEO is Bob Pease. The American Homebrewers Association was founded by past BA president, Charlie Papazian.

American Homebrewers Association

The BA was established in 2005 through a merger of the Association of Brewers headed by brewer Charlie Papazian and the Brewers' Association of America, intending to "promote and protect small and independent American brewers, their craft beers and the community of brewing enthusiasts."

The American Homebrewers Association is a division of the Brewers Association focused on homebrewers of beer, cider, and mead.  The AHA was founded in 1978 by Charlie Papazian in Boulder, Colorado. The AHA runs the world's largest homebrew competition  and also organizes several homebrew events in the United States and Canada. Julia Herz is the current executive director. The AHA publishes the magazine Zymurgy six times per year to its 37,000 members.

Every year the AHA hosts the following events:
 National Homebrew Competition
 Homebrew Con (previously known as the National Homebrewers Conference) which includes the finals of the National Homebrew Competition
 Big Brew, held the first Saturday in May
 Mead Day, held the first Saturday in August
 Learn to Homebrew Day, held the first Saturday in November

Ninkasi Award
The Ninkasi Award is the prize given by American Homebrewers Association for the brewer who gains the most points in the final round of the National Homebrew Competition, judged at the National Homebrewers Conference. Points are gained from the brewer's winning entries in the 23 categories of beer and several categories of mead and cider. At least 2 points (1 bronze placement) must come from a beer entry.

The Ninkasi Award is named in honor of Ninkasi, the Sumerian goddess of beer.

Past winners
The winners since the introduction of the Ninkasi Award in 1992:

Brewers Publications
Brewers Publications was started in 1986 and is under the umbrella of the Brewers Association organization. The first book Brewers Publications published was Brewing Lager Beer: The Most Comprehensive Book for Home- and Microbreweries by Greg Noonan.

References

External links
 

2005 establishments in Colorado
Beer awards
Beer in the United States
Beer organizations
Companies based in Boulder, Colorado
Homebrewing
Organizations based in Colorado
Trade associations based in the United States